Lewis Wardlaw "Lew" Parker Jr. (June 30, 1928 – January 29, 2011) from South Hill, Virginia was a politician and former Democratic member of the Virginia House of Delegates. He represented the 61st district, which included parts of Amelia, Brunswick, Lunenburg, Mecklenburg, Nottoway, and Prince Edward counties. He held the seat from his first election in 1972 to his defeat for re-election in 1993.

References

External links
Official House bio

1928 births
2011 deaths
Democratic Party members of the Virginia House of Delegates
Politicians from Greenville, South Carolina
People from South Hill, Virginia
University of Virginia alumni
20th-century American Episcopalians